Capital TV was a British rolling-music television channel owned by Global as a visual brand extension of radio's Capital FM. The channel played current chart hits.

It reached 820,000 viewers on average every month on Sky alone.

Capital TV was only allowed to play two or three commercial breaks each hour, 5 minutes long each. This was also the format for Heart TV.

History
On 3 July 2012, Global announced it would launch a TV channel of the same name, Capital. The channels could also be watched via dedicated iOS apps, as well as online. On 17 October 2012, Capital TV also launched on Freeview in Manchester. Both channels played non-stop music videos 24 hours a day, 7 days a week and also featured some exclusive content, such as the Jingle Bell Ball. On 24 July 2012 it was confirmed BSkyB would be responsible for ad sales on both channels, likewise with the radio station, Capital TV was aimed at a younger target audience.

The channel was not related to the former Restricted Service Licence television channel of the same name, which ran in Cardiff between 2002 and 2009.

It was removed from Freesat on 10 October 2018, and on Sky the next day, along with Heart TV, and all mentions of it have disappeared from the Capital FM website. The first music video aired on the channel was “Let Me Love You (Until You Learn to Love Yourself)” by Ne-Yo and the last music video was "Thunderclouds" by Labrinth, Sia and Diplo before showing a few minutes of "Havana" by Camila Cabello featuring Young Thug before freezing halfway through the video making the channel cease transmission at 6am.

References

Global Radio
Music video networks in the United Kingdom
Television channels and stations established in 2012
Television channels and stations disestablished in 2018
Defunct television channels in the United Kingdom